"Mother Dear" is a 1965 song recorded by the Supremes for the Motown label.

Written and produced by Motown's main production team, Holland–Dozier–Holland, it was an unreleased single for More Hits by The Supremes; it was canceled in favor of the single "Nothing but Heartaches", as it was considered too lightweight to follow their previous single, "Back in My Arms Again". The label decided instead to release it as a follow-up single, but when "Nothing But Heartaches" failed to make it to the Top Ten, missing it by just one position and breaking the string of number-one Supremes hits, Motown chief Berry Gordy circulated a memo around the Motown offices that read as follows:

Thus the song was canceled a final time in favor of "I Hear a Symphony".

The song was re-recorded two more times with a second version recorded in the fall of 1965; possibly to be used as the single for its planned October release and then a third version in March 1966. The 1966 version was arranged differently from previous versions and used a syncopated clave rhythm arrangement best known as the Bo Diddley beat making the song more danceable. The second 1965 version was not released until 2012. An original stereo mix of the third version from 1966 was not released until 2000. A new mix of the third version was released in 2017 containing elements edited out from the original 1960s mix.

The song was originally recorded as 'It's All Your Fault' in February 1965 which the song remained unreleased. Holland-Dozier-Holland rewrote the song into "Mother Dear" having the lyrics and parts of the melody changed.
As an intended single release, The Supremes performed "Mother Dear on NBC-TV's The Dean Martin Show on a 1965 telecast. They also performed the song on CBS-TV's The Red Skelton Show.

Version 1 Credits
Lead vocals by Diana Ross
Background vocals by Florence Ballard and Mary Wilson
Instrumentation by the Funk Brothers

Version 2 Credits
Lead vocals by Diana Ross
Background vocals by Florence Ballard and Mary Wilson
Instrumentation by the Funk Brothers

Version 3 Credits
Lead vocals by Diana Ross
Background vocals by Florence Ballard, Mary Wilson, and the Andantes
Instrumentation by the Funk Brothers

References

 The Complete Motown Singles Vol. 5: 1965 [CD liner notes]. New York: Hip-O Select/Motown/Universal Records.
 Ribowsky, Mark. "The Supremes: A Saga of Motown Dreams, Success, and Betrayal". New York: Da Capo Press, 2009.

External links
The Supremes' performance of cancelled Motown single Mother Dear on NBC-TV's The Dean Martin Show

1965 singles
The Supremes songs
Songs written by Holland–Dozier–Holland
Song recordings produced by Brian Holland
Song recordings produced by Lamont Dozier
1965 songs